Swiss Canadians are Canadian citizens of Swiss ancestry or people who emigrated from Switzerland and reside in Canada. According to the 2016 Census there were 155,120 Canadians  who claimed Swiss ancestry, having an increase compared to those 146,830 in the 2011 Census.

One of the earliest settlers in Canada was Pierre Miville (d. 1669). Laurenz Ermatinger (1736 to 1789), a fur trader and merchant, arrived in Montreal from Switzerland and together with his son Charles Oakes (1776 to 1833), and Sebastian Freyvogel have explored the large Huron tract. By 1871 about 3,000 Swiss had settled in Canada and in the time between 1887 and 1938, a reported additional 8,548 Swiss had moved to Canada. Peter Rindisbacher was a Swiss artist who specialized in painting the Western USA and Canada until his death in 1834.

Until WWII, most Swiss immigrants were farmers who settled in Canada. This changed after WWII, when several Swiss firms opened offices in Canada, leading to immigration of educated Swiss personnel including engineers, professors and merchants. When farmland became unaffordable in Switzerland in the 1970s, a number of Swiss farmers bought farmland in Canada and settled there. In the 1990s, rising unemployment in Switzerland led to another wave of emigration.

Swiss Canadians by numbers

See also 

Canada–Switzerland relations
European Canadians
Swiss Americans

References 

European Canadian
 
 
Canada